The Descendant (Simplified Chinese: 香火) (Literally: Incense, a word play of inscent) is a Malaysian 2012 mega blockbuster Mandarin drama series produced by Juita Entertainment for ntv7. It is scheduled to air every Monday to Thursday, at 10:00pm on ntv7, starting 9 February 2012. This 30-episode period drama is set on the incense industry. Casting was made on 25 June 2011 and started filming on 7 July 2011.

Plot
Chen Yulin (Steve Yap) is forced to marry Shen Danfang (Yeo Yann Yann) to inherit her family's incense making business. Yulin has also promised his father-in-law to let their first child to follow Dan Fang's family name to ensure the continuity of the bloodline. On the day of their marriage, Yulin was surprised when he realized Yuhua (Debbie Goh), his longtime lover, is now his sister-in-law.

Cast

Main Cast

Supporting Cast

References

Chinese-language drama television series in Malaysia
2012 Malaysian television series debuts
2012 Malaysian television series endings
NTV7 original programming